A town is a sub-type of municipalities in the Canadian province of Ontario. A town can have the municipal status of either a single-tier or lower-tier municipality.

Ontario has 89 towns that had a cumulative population of 1,813,458 and an average population of 22,316 in the 2016 Census. Ontario's largest and smallest towns are Oakville and Latchford with populations of 193,832 and 313 respectively.

History 
Under the former Municipal Act, 1990, a town was both an urban and a local municipality. Under this former legislation, a locality with a population of 2,000 or more could have been incorporated as a town by Ontario's Municipal Board upon review of an application from 75 or more residents of the locality. It also enabled the Municipal Board to change the status of a village or township to a town if it had a population of 2,000 upon review of an application from the village or township.

In the transition to the Municipal Act, 2001, these requirements were abandoned and, as at December 31, 2002, every town that:
"existed and formed part of a county, a regional or district municipality or the County of Oxford for municipal purposes" became a lower-tier municipality yet retained its name as a town; and
"existed and did not form part of a county, a regional or district municipality or the County of Oxford for municipal purposes" became a single-tier municipality yet retained its name as a town.
The current legislation also provides lower and single-tier municipalities with the authority to name themselves as "towns", or other former municipal status types such as "cities", "villages" or "townships", or generically as "municipalities".

Towns in Ontario

See also 
List of cities in Ontario
List of communities in Ontario
List of municipalities in Ontario
List of township municipalities in Ontario
List of villages in Ontario

References 

Towns